{{DISPLAYTITLE:C16H26O}}
The molecular formula C16H26O (molar mass: 234.38 g/mol, exact mass: 234.1984 u) may refer to:

 Callicarpenal
 Tetramethyl acetyloctahydronaphthalenes, also known as OTNE or Iso E Super

Molecular formulas